Opole  is a village in the administrative district of Gmina Podedwórze, within Parczew County, Lublin Voivodeship, in eastern Poland.

The village has a population of 192.

References

Opole